Macallum is a surname. Notable people with the name include:
 Archibald Macallum (1858–1934), Canadian biochemist
 Hamilton Macallum (1841–1896), Scottish painter
 Charles John Macallum, known as Rabbit Mac (born 1983), Hip Hop and Rap based Indian singer from Malaysia

See also 
 McCallum (disambiguation)